OSF/1 is a variant of the Unix operating system developed by the Open Software Foundation during the late 1980s and early 1990s. OSF/1 is one of the first operating systems to have used the Mach kernel developed at Carnegie Mellon University, and is probably best known as the native Unix operating system for DEC Alpha architecture systems.

In 1994, after AT&T had sold UNIX System V to Novell and the rival Unix International consortium had disbanded, the Open Software Foundation ceased funding of research and development of OSF/1. The Tru64 UNIX variant of OSF/1 was supported by HP until 2012.

Background 
In 1988, during the so-called "Unix wars", Digital Equipment Corporation (DEC) joined with IBM, Hewlett-Packard, and others to form the Open Software Foundation (OSF) to develop a version of Unix named OSF/1. The aim was to compete with System V Release 4 from AT&T Corporation and Sun Microsystems, and it has been argued that a primary goal was for the operating system to be free of AT&T intellectual property. The fact that OSF/1 is one of the first operating systems to have used the Mach kernel is cited as support of this assertion. Digital also strongly promoted OSF/1 for real-time applications, and with traditional UNIX implementations at the time providing poor real-time support at best, the real-time and multi-threading support can be interpreted as having been heavily dependent on the Mach kernel. It also incorporates a large part of the BSD kernel (based on the 4.3-Reno release) to implement the UNIX API. At the time of its introduction, OSF/1 became the third major flavor of UNIX together with System V and BSD.

Vendor releases 
DEC's first release of OSF/1 (OSF/1 Release 1.0) in January 1992 was for its line of MIPS-based DECstation workstations, however this was never a fully supported product. DEC ported OSF/1 to their new Alpha AXP platform as DEC OSF/1 AXP Release 1.2, released in March 1993. OSF/1 AXP is a full 64-bit operating system. After OSF/1 AXP V2.0 onwards, UNIX System V compatibility was also integrated into the system. OSF/1 v2 was also released for DECStation MIPS systems the same year. Subsequent releases are named Digital UNIX, and later, Tru64 UNIX.

HP also released a port of OSF/1 to the early HP 9000/700 workstations based on the PA-RISC 1.1 architecture. This was withdrawn soon afterwards due to lack of software and hardware support compared to competing operating systems, specifically HP-UX.

As part of the AIM alliance and the resulting PowerOpen specification, Apple Computer intended to base A/UX 4.0 for its PowerPC-based Macintoshes upon OSF/1, but the project was cancelled and PowerOpen deprecated.

IBM used OSF/1 as the basis of the AIX/ESA operating system for System/370 and System/390 mainframes.

OSF/1 was also ported by Kendall Square Research to its proprietary microarchitecture used in the KSR1 supercomputer.

OSFMK 
The Open Software Foundation created OSFMK which is a commercial version of the Mach kernel for use in OSF/1. It contains applicable code from the University of Utah Mach 4 kernel (such as the "Shuttles" modification used to speed up message passing) and applicable code from the many Mach 3.0 variants that sprouted off from the original Carnegie Mellon University Mach 3.0 kernel. It also consists of improvements made by the OSF such as built-in collocation capability, realtime improvements, and rewriting of the IPC RPC component for better performance .

OSF/1 AD 
OSF/1 AD (Advanced Development) was a distributed version of OSF/1 developed for massively parallel supercomputers by Locus Computing Corporation. Variants of OSF/1 AD are on several such systems, including the Intel Paragon XP/S and ASCI Red, Convex Exemplar SPP-1200 (as SPP-UX) and the Hitachi SR2201 (as HI-UX MPP).

References 

Discontinued operating systems
Mach (kernel)
Microkernel-based operating systems
Unix variants
Computer-related introductions in 1992